Good Shepherd Church, also known as Good Shepherd Mission, is a historic Roman Catholic church at SR 61 SW of East Bank Coalburg, Kanawha County, West Virginia.  It was built about 1880, and consists of a five bay, one-story ell with a steeply pitched front gabled roof. It sits on a high raised limestone foundation. Also on the property is an ornate Celtic cross that rests on earth from County Kerry, Ireland, and was placed there in 1912. The church is significant in part due to its association with Irish and Italian immigrant miners during the early years of the church.

It was listed on the National Register of Historic Places in 1990.

References

Roman Catholic churches completed in 1880
Churches in Kanawha County, West Virginia
Churches in the Roman Catholic Diocese of Wheeling-Charleston
Gothic Revival church buildings in West Virginia
Irish-American culture in West Virginia
Italian-American culture in West Virginia
National Register of Historic Places in Kanawha County, West Virginia
Churches on the National Register of Historic Places in West Virginia
19th-century Roman Catholic church buildings in the United States